Khaira is an Ahir-dominated urban village inhabited by people belonging to Lamba and Aphariya gotra, located on Shaheed Rao Laxmi Chand Marg (the road well known as Main Khaira Road) in Najafgarh tehsil of South West Delhi, Delhi.

The village is a part of Surheda Seventeen Village Panchayat.

Geography 
The village consists of six Mohallas (PANNA):

 Swami/Bairagi  Mohalla (Guru's and founder  of Village called "Maharaj")
 Kanyawada Panna (Lamba Patti.)
 Bagdi Panna
 Sadhwada Panna (People of this panna follows the preachings of Dada Sadh and thus do not eat Onions, Garlic, Tobacco etc at their homes)
 Afria Panna (Afria Panna is near Dadi Khimmi Mandir )
 Kabir Colony (Panna).

Schools and colleges
 G.G.S.S School Khaira/G.B.S.S School Khaira
 South Delhi Municipal Corporation Primary School for Girls Khaira
 South Delhi Municipal Corporation Primary Co-ed School Khaira
 Jawahar Navodaya Vidyalaya Jaffarpur Kalan, approx 7 km from Khaira Village
 Ch. Brahm Prakash Government Engineering College, approx 7 km from Khaira Village
 Ch. Brahm Prakash industrial training institute Jaffarpur Kalan, approx 7 km from Khaira Village
 Bhagini Nivedita Women College, KAIR village and about 5 km from Khaira village
 Integral model school in Khaira village

Government Hospitals
South Delhi Municipal Corporation Unani Dispensary Kahira.
Rural Health Training Center Najafgarh approx 2.5 km from Khaira Village
Rao Tula Ram Memorial Hospital, Jafarpur Kalan Village approx. 7 km from Khaira Village
Chaudhary Brahm Prakash Ayurved Charak Sansthan, Khera Dabur Village Najafgarh New Delhi-110043
ESIC Dispensary, Najafgarh approx 1.5 km from Khaira Village.

Markets
The nearest market is the main Najafgarh market.

Transport
Delhi Transport Corporation Route: 828(Tilak Nagar (Delhi) to Galibpur), 887 (Tilak Nagar (Delhi) to Ghumen Hera)
The nearest Delhi Metro station is Dhansa Stand, Najafgarh.

Banks
 Union Bank Of India
 Indian Bank

Holy Places
 Dadi Khimmi Mandir 
 Radha Krishan Mandir near Dadi Khimmi Mandir
 Shiv ji, Hanuman ji and Shani Dev Mandir 
 Very Popular and ancient Mandir of Goddess Dadi Bai ji 
 Dada Bhaiya Mandir (Dada Khera)
 Mata Mandir
 Dada Ghoruwala Mandir
 Dada Sadh Mandir (Onions and garlic are not grown in the land around this area)
 Dada Badri Mandir
 Kabir Mandir.

References

Neighbourhoods in Delhi